Asaf Jah VI, also known as, Sir Mir Mahboob Ali Khan Siddiqi Bayafandi  (17 August 1866 – 29 August 1911) was the 6th Nizam of Hyderabad. He ruled Hyderabad state, one of the Princely states in India between 1869 and 1911.

Early life

Mahboob Ali Khan was born on 17 August 1866 at Purani Haveli in Hyderabad, Hyderabad State (in present-day Telangana, India). He was the youngest son of 5th Nizam Afzal-ud-Daulah. Afzal-ud-Daulah died on 28 February 1869. On 29 February, he ascended the throne under the regency of Dewan Salar Jung I and Shams-ul-Umra III. Mahboob Ali Khan was two years and seven months old at that time. While Salar Jung I served as regent, Shams-ul-Umra III served as co-regent.

Mahboob Ali Khan was the first Nizam to be exposed to western education. A special school under the guidance of Captain Claude Clerk was setup in the Chowmahalla Palace. The children of Salar Jung I, Shams-ul-Umra III and Kishen Pershad were his classmates. Besides English, he was also taught Persian, Arabic and Urdu languages. In 1874, Captain John Clerk, a former tutor to the Duke of Edinburgh was appointed to teach him English. Clarke imbibed in " young Mahboob the customs and manners of high English society". Captain Clerk worked closely with an Indian tutor, Navab Agha Mirza Sarvar al-Mulk, who shared in supervising the nizam's education and ultimately became a close confidant and advisor to the nizam.

Reign

Investiture
At the age of sixteen, Salar Jung I began introducing Mahboob Ali Khan into the administrative processes of the state. The highest ranking officials of various departments would meet him to teach him the working of their respective departments. The regency of Salar Jung I and Shams-ul-Umra ended when Mahboob Ali Khan came out of age. His investiture ceremony took place on 5 February 1884. Lord Ripon, the Governor-General of India was present at the ceremony and gifted him a golden sword which was studded with diamonds. Mahboob Ali Khan took the title His Exalted Highness Asaf Jah, Muzaffar-ul-Mulk, Nawab Mahbub Ali Khan Bahadur, Fateh Jung.

Development of a railway network
Nizam's Guaranteed State Railway - a railway company fully owned by the Nizams was established in 1879. It was formed to connect Hyderabad State with the rest of British India, and was headquartered at Secunderabad Railway Station. Construction commenced in 1870. After four years of construction, the Secunderabad-Wadi line was built. In 1879, Mahbub Ali Khan took over this railway line; it was then managed by the Nizam's state-owned railway.

After independence, it was integrated into Indian Railways. The introduction of railways also marked the beginning of the industry in Hyderabad, and four factories were built to the south and east of the Hussain Sagar lake.

Education development
Mahboob Ali Khan established Hyderabad medical college, a first in India and commissioned for chloroform a first in world, during 1873 there were 14 schools in Hyderabad city and 141 schools in rest of the districts, which reached 1000 at the time of his death.

Events during his rule

Flood of 1908

The Great Musi Flood of 1908 ravaged the city of Hyderabad. It affected at least 200,000 people, killing an estimated 15,000. He opened his palace to accommodate the flood victims until "normal conditions were restored". Upon the guidance of the holy priest of the Katta Maisamma Temple, he also took part in a Yagna and it is believed that the waters started receding within hours of the yagna being performed.

Famine during his rule
The Great Famine of 1876-1878 occurred during his reign. The entire Deccan, including Hyderabad Deccan, was devastated by food shortages which were enormously exacerbated by British policies. The Nizam distributed aid to famine victims, causing tens of thousands of people to flee to Hyderabad from Sholapur and other affected areas.

Abolishing the practice of Sati

The practice of Sati a Hindu tradition in which a women used to jump into the burning pyre of their husbands concerned the Nizam. Taking serious note of Sati being continued in some parts of his kingdom despite the ban, he issued a Royal Firman on 12 November 1876 stating:

 "It is now notified that if anybody takes any action in this direction in the future, they will have to face serious consequences. If Taluqdars, Naibs, Jagirdars, Zamindars and others are found careless and negligent in the matter, serious action will be taken against them by the government."

Personal life 

According to the Viceroy of India Lord Lytton; has a doubt that the object of the Diwan, Salar Jung I wanted to reduce Mir Mahboob Ali Khan to a cipher, in order to hold the power of the State and remain concentrated in his own hands.
The sixth Nizam had seven sons and seven daughters.

Marriage
He was married to Amat Uz Zahra Begum, daughter of Salar Jung I, with whom he fell in love while studying at the age of 18.

Lifestyle
The Nizam was well known for his extravagant lifestyle and collection of clothes and cars. His collection of clothes was one of the most extensive in the world at the time. He devoted a whole wing of his palace to his wardrobe and would never wear the same outfit twice. He bought the Jacob Diamond, which stands out among the Jewels of The Nizams now owned by the Government of India.

The Nizam was also fluent in Urdu, Telugu and Persian languages. He also wrote poems in Telugu and Urdu, some of which are inscribed alongside the walls of Tank Bund. He was a keen hunter, killing at least 30 tigers.

Death
The 6th Nizam died on 29 August 1911 at the age of 45. He was buried alongside his ancestors at Mecca Masjid, Hyderabad. His second son Mir Osman Ali Khan succeeded him; he was the last Nizam of Hyderabad.

Mystical powers
He claimed to possess a healing power against snakebites. It was his order that if anyone from the public had a snake bite, they could approach him. As a result, he was repeatedly awakened from his sleep to cure people of snakebites.

Other names

Mahboob Ali Pasha 
He was better known as "Mahboob Ali Pasha" by the people. "Mahboob" meaning "Dear one".

Tees Maar Khan 
Mahboob Ali Khan was known as a skilled hunter. Many times people from nearby villages used to call for his help to kill tigers lurking in the nearby fields, thereby causing threat to the lives of poor farmers. Hence, he ended up killing at least 33 Tigers during his lifetime. He was popularly known as Tees Maar Khan meaning the "Khan" who killed "tees" (thirty) tigers.

Despite his reputation as a tiger hunter, Khan was known for his compassion and love for all living things. He would never kill a tiger unless it was a matter of necessity, and he always treated the animals he hunted with respect. He understood that the tiger was not just a threat, but a magnificent creature that deserved to live unless posing a threat to humankind.

Full Titular name
1866–1869: Sahibzada Mir Mahbub Ali Khan Siddiqi Bahadur
1869–1877: His Highness Rustam-i-Dauran, Arustu-i-Zaman, Wal Mamaluk, Asaf Jah VI, Muzaffar ul-Mamaluk, Nizam ul-Mulk, Nizam ud-Daula, Nawab Mir Mahbub 'Ali Khan Bahadur, Sipah Salar, Fath Jang, Nizam of Hyderabad
1877–1884: His Highness Rustam-i-Dauran, Arustu-i-Zaman, Wal Mamaluk, Asaf Jah VI, Muzaffar ul-Mamaluk, Nizam ul-Mulk, Nizam ud-Daula, Nawab Mir Mahbub 'Ali Khan Siddiqi Bahadur, Sipah Salar, Fath Jang, Nizam of Hyderabad
1884–1902: His Highness Rustam-i-Dauran, Arustu-i-Zaman, Wal Mamaluk, Asaf Jah VI, Muzaffar ul-Mamaluk, Nizam ul-Mulk, Nizam ud-Daula, Nawab Sir Mir Mahbub 'Ali Khan Bahadur, Sipah Salar, Fath Jang, Nizam of Hyderabad, GCSI
1903–1910: His Highness Rustam-i-Dauran, Arustu-i-Zaman, Wal Mamaluk, Asaf Jah VI, Muzaffar ul-Mamaluk, Nizam ul-Mulk, Nizam ud-Daula, Nawab Sir Mir Mahboob 'Ali Khan Bahadur, Sipah Salar, Fath Jang, Nizam of Hyderabad, GCB, GCSI
1910–1911: Lieutenant-General His Highness Rustam-i-Dauran, Arustu-i-Zaman, Wal Mamaluk, Asaf Jah VI, Muzaffar ul-Mamaluk, Nizam ul-Mulk, Nizam ud-Daula, Nawab Mir Sir Mahbub 'Ali Khan Siddiqi Bahadur, Sipah Salar, Fath Jang, Nizam of Hyderabad, GCB, GCSI

Honours

(ribbon bar, as it would look today)
British honours
Empress of India Gold Medal, 1877
Knight Grand Commander of the Order of the Star of India (GCSI), 1884
Honorary Knight Grand Cross of the Order of the Bath (GCB), in the 1903 Durbar Honours list, 1903
Delhi Durbar Gold Medal, 1903

Foreign honours
 Grand Cross of the Order of the Red Eagle, 1911

See also
Hyderabad State
Nizam
:Category:Establishments in Hyderabad State
Jewels of the Nizams
Nizam College

References

External links
A man of many talents
Birthday Celebrations

Jah
Jah
20th-century Indian royalty
Indian Muslims
Nizams of Hyderabad
Knights Grand Commander of the Order of the Star of India
Honorary Knights Grand Cross of the Order of the Bath
Asaf Jahi dynasty
Founders of Indian schools and colleges
History of Telangana
Indian royalty
Child monarchs from Asia
Urdu-language poets from India